Guy Van Waas (Brussels, 15 April 1948) is a Belgian conductor, clarinetist and organist.

He was clarinetist of the Orchestre des Champs-Élysées, Akademie für Alte Musik Berlin and the Orchestra of the Eighteenth Century. Since 2001 he is director of Les Agrémens, a baroque orchestra sponsored by the Communauté française de Belgique and conductor of the Choeur de Chambre de Namur. He was also professor of chamber music at the Conservatoire of Mons.

Discography
 Joseph Haydn : Symphony Nr. 82 & 86 & Ludwig August Lebrun Hoboconcert, (Ricercar, 2010)
 André Ernest-Modeste Grétry Céphale et Procris ou l'Amour conjugal Ballet-héroique 1773. Ricercar RIC 302 2CDs, 2010.
 Rodolphe Kreutzer La mort d'Abel Ediciones Speciales, 2012
 Antoine Dauvergne: La Vénitienne Opéra-ballet (Ricercar, 2012)
 François-Joseph Gossec: Thésée, Tragédie-lyrique (Ricercar, 2013)
 André Modeste Grétry: La caravane du Caire, Comédie-lyrique (Ricercar, 2013)
 Jean Philippe Rameau: Le Temple de la Gloire Ballet-héroïque (Ricercar, 2014)
 Carl Maria von Weber: Klarinettenkonzerte Nr.1 & 2, Orchestra of the Eighteenth Century, with Eric Hoeprich, clarinet (Glossa, 2019)

References

1948 births
Belgian conductors (music)
Belgian male musicians
Male conductors (music)
Living people
21st-century conductors (music)
21st-century male musicians